The Mastretta MXT is an automobile produced by the Mexican car manufacturer Mastretta. It is the first car that Mastretta has designed without any foreign input. The MXT is based loosely on the Lotus Elise and the Audi R8. The MXT entered production on 1 January 2011. It has received national and international attention for being almost entirely produced and designed in Mexico. Production of the Mastretta MXT ended in May 2014.

History

Prototipo Cero
The MXT Prototipo Cero (Spanish for Prototype Zero) was the third automotive development by Mastretta and succeeded MXB and MXA kit-cars. The name "MXT" comes from Mastretta and Mexico as well as a reference to its Transverse engine configuration.

The Prototipo Cero was developed between 2004 and 2007, and was powered by a modified uprated Volkswagen inline-4  engine that is also used in the still-produced fourth generation Jetta. The increased power allowed the vehicle to reach  however Mastretta decided the vehicle needed a more powerful engine. Production was originally set to begin in the first quarter of 2008 but the vehicle's release was postponed while Mastretta entered negotiations with several automobile manufacturers from which to acquire a more powerful engine.

Pre-production version

On 22 July 2008, the Mastretta MXT was presented at the British International Motor Show, held in London. Although the model shown was the prototype version, the company revealed that the final production version would be significantly different and specifications regarding the production model would be unveiled soon.

In 2009 Mastretta revealed the specifications and equipment to be equipped on the 2011 production MXT.

Standard features were planned to include racing bucket seats and seatbelts, Hella xenon headlights, ABS brakes, an SRS airbag system, 17 inch magnesium wheels, digital board instruments, Borla exhaust, an LCD display based digital MP3 and CD player entertainment system and automatic climate control system. The vehicle's security and safety features were specifically designed to surpass EU crash and safety standards and the vehicle was confirmed by lead designer Daniel Mastretta to already be undergoing tests to qualify for European quality and safety standards in 2009.

Three years after its first appearance on Automóvil Panamericano, the 2011 production model MXT debuted at the 2010 Paris Motor Show on September 30, 2010. The MXT entered production on 1 January 2011, at Mastretta's new factory in Mexico State with an expected 2011 production of 150 units. Around 70% (105 cars) will be exported to Europe and the United States, and 45 will remain for domestic sales.

Production version

The 2012 Mastretta MXT was officially introduced to the international motoring press at the Los Angeles motor show in November 2011. In production, it is constructed on a tube-frame monocoque chassis, using double wishbone suspension pieces front and rear, carrying coil springs and monoshocks. Carbon-fiber body elements and aluminum elements in the chassis contribute to a low curb weight of 930 kg.

Origin
Daniel Mastretta commented in London:

Prices
The price for the MXT started at US$58,000 depending on options. Sales began in early 2011 in the United Kingdom and Mexico, followed by other countries including France and the U.S.

See also
Cars in Mexico
Mastretta Unidiseño
Audi R8
Lotus Elise

Notes

 
 
 

  (seems to have ed oversight, e.g. RS, should be looked into

External links

Mastretta Official Page (English and Spanish)
conceptcarz.com on Mastretta MTX
Mastretta MXT road test video on YouTube

Cars of Mexico
Cars introduced in 2011
Rear mid-engine, rear-wheel-drive vehicles